JEGS High Performance is the second largest mail order company of automotive equipment in the United States. It sells  performance auto parts, aftermarket accessories, tools, and race apparel. JEGS was founded by Jeg Coughlin Sr. in 1960 as a small speed shop.  Since its inception, the business has remained family owned and operated.  Over 55 years, JEGS has expanded to include a  warehouse, two mail order locations, retail store & Team JEGS Race Team. The company has approximately 350 employees.

History
Jeg Sr. started JEGS Automotive Inc. in a garage near downtown Columbus, Ohio because there was no source in the Midwest to obtain high-performance auto parts to modify hot rods. As JEGS became known for their full selection, the "garage" grew into a successful company.

When Jeg Sr.'s four sons, John, Troy, Mike, and Jeg Jr. were old enough, they bought the business from their father with his assistance, each managing a different department to maximize effectiveness. JEGS High Performance has a retail store, two call centers, and a distribution warehouse that delivers more than $250 million worth of products annually to rodders and racers globally.

Racing
With seven NHRA World Championships, sixteen Division Championships, and well over 100 victories at the national, divisional, and local levels, Team JEGS is among the most accomplished racing entities in the 60-year history of organized drag racing.

John is a racer who has shifted focus to his son Cody's career in circle track racing; Cody competes in the NASCAR Camping World Truck Series and ARCA Racing Series. John's daughter, Kennedi, enjoys ice skating.

An NHRA Pro Modified Champion, Troy Sr. has joined his son Troy Jr. in a JEGS.com two-car Pro Mod effort for 2015. Troy Jr. also competes in NHRA's Sportsman Class. Troy Sr.'s daughter, Meghan, races when she can, while sisters Paige & Kelly drive Junior Dragsters.

Mike continues to find success in Sportsman Classes, plus mentors his sons Jack and Clay in drag racing and other sports.

Jeg Jr. is a six-time NHRA Champion, winning his fifth Pro Stock title in 2013 as one of drag racing's greatest drivers. His son, Jeg III, is a championship golfer in high school.

Charitable contributions
Jeg Sr., his sons, and their families created the JEGS Foundation Racing for Cancer Research program to benefit James Cancer Hospital and Richard J. Solove Research Institute at Ohio State University. With 100% of proceeds going directly to cancer research, the JEGS Foundation Racing for Cancer Research program has raised several million dollars. Team JEGS also sets up mobile cancer screening centers at NHRA weekend events to keep the topic front & center with thousands of drag racing fans.

The foundation’s distinctive logo is a ribbon featuring the black & white motif of racing's checkered flag filled in with various cancer awareness colors. It adorns every race car and crew member uniform across the Team JEGS motorsports platform.

In June 2013 the JEGS Foundation donated $10 million to OSU's Foundation for Cancer Treatment & Research at Ohio State University Comprehensive Cancer Center in Columbus, Ohio. The new lobby of the James Cancer Hospital and Solove Research Institute was named the "JEGS Foundation Lobby" to commemorate the donation

References 
2.  JEGS own Page Coughlin to debut in No Prep Kings for season 5.
 Asher, John (May 22, 2009). NHRA Finals – Down to the Wire. CompetitionPlus magazine. Retrieved July 7, 2010.

External links 
 

Companies based in the Columbus, Ohio metropolitan area
Privately held companies based in Ohio
Automotive part retailers of the United States
Automotive motorsports and performance companies